Roderick Chase (born 12 October 1967) is a Barbadian former cyclist. He competed in two events at the 1988 Summer Olympics.

References

External links
 

1967 births
Living people
Barbadian male cyclists
Olympic cyclists of Barbados
Cyclists at the 1988 Summer Olympics
Place of birth missing (living people)